Leonardo José Flores Soto (born 5 August 1995) is a Venezuelan professional footballer who plays as a midfielder for Patriotas.

Career
Flores' career started with Caracas. He was awarded his professional debut in February 2014, being substituted on with eleven minutes remaining of a Venezuelan Primera División encounter with Deportivo La Guaira. Flores made a further twenty-four appearances in all competitions for Caracas between the 2014–15 and 2016 seasons, notably featuring in continental football for the first time on 2 February 2016 during a Copa Libertadores defeat to Huracán.

Career statistics
.

References

External links

1995 births
Living people
People from Apure
Venezuelan footballers
Association football midfielders
Venezuelan Primera División players
Caracas FC players